Manna Mission Hospital is a private health institution in Teshie, Greater Accra, Ghana.

References 

Hospitals in Ghana